Peavy is a ghost town in Angelina County, in the U.S. state of Texas. It is located within the Lufkin, Texas micropolitan area.

History
Peavy was one of the many sawmills built in the area during the 1880s. It was named for members of a local family with the surname who came to the area from Alabama. Anderson Jasper Peavy was a well-known lumberjack in both Angelina County and Louisiana. The community had a population of 100 in 1904.

Geography

Education
The Peavy Switch School District was joined with the Hudson Independent School District along with the ones in Providence and Happy Hour.

See also
List of ghost towns in Texas

References

Geography of Angelina County, Texas
Ghost towns in East Texas